There are 30 stadiums in use by Triple-A Minor League Baseball teams, which are the top affiliates of Major League Baseball clubs. The International League uses 20 stadiums, and the Pacific Coast League uses 10. The oldest stadium among these teams is Cheney Stadium, home of the Pacific Coast League's Tacoma Rainiers, which opened in 1959. The newest stadium is Polar Park, home of the International League's Worcester Red Sox, which opened in 2021. The highest seating capacity of all active Triple-A teams is 16,600 at Sahlen Field, where the International League's Buffalo Bisons play. The stadium with the lowest capacity is Tacoma's Cheney Stadium, which seats 6,500.

Stadiums

International League

Pacific Coast League

Map

References

Minor league baseball venues
Triple-A
Triple-A baseball stadiums
 triple-a